Bokes Creek is a stream in the U.S. state of Ohio. It is a tributary of the Scioto River.

Bokes Creek is named after Arthur Boke who was a hunter, scout and friend to surveyor Lucas Sullivant, the man who surveyed  the area of Darby Creek and Bokes Creek. According to folk etymology, Bokes Creek derives its name from a Native American word meaning "lost", the creek being so named after an Indian lost his life in the creek. Another source maintains Boke was the name of an Indian chief.

Location

Mouth: Confluence with the Scioto River west of Delaware 
Origin: Logan County east of Rushsylvania

See also
List of rivers of Ohio

References

Rivers of Delaware County, Ohio
Rivers of Logan County, Ohio
Rivers of Union County, Ohio
Rivers of Ohio